Catch Me I'm Falling is the 1988 official debut album (second album overall after the Laced EP) by the American dance-pop group Pretty Poison, who consisted of Jade Starling and Whey Cooler. It contains the title track "Catch Me (I'm Falling)", which was a top ten hit in the U.S. and also hit number one on the Billboard Hot Dance Club Play chart the previous year. The second single off the album was a remix of their 1984 dance hit "Nighttime", which references Whodini's 1984 song "Freaks Come Out at Night", and was a top 40 hit in May 1988. The third single, "When I Look into Your Eyes", peaked on the dance chart in September of the same year.

Track listing
All tracks written by Jade Starling and Whey Cooler except where noted.

"Hold Me" – 5:37
"Nighttime" – 4:17
"Closer" – 6:05
"When I Look into Your Eyes" – 4:12
"Let Freedom Ring" (Starling, Cooler, Bobby Corea) – 4:32
"Catch Me (I'm Falling)" – 4:54
"The Look" – 5:13
"Don't Cry" – 5:05
"Shine" – 4:42
"Heaven" (J. Wilson, J. Cohen, I. Gold, Starling, Cooler) – 5:04

Personnel

Pretty Poison
Jade Starling: Vocals
Whey Cooler: Guitars, Keyboards, Electronic Percussion
David "Kaya" Prior: Percussion (on "Nighttime" and "Catch Me, I'm Falling")

Additional Personnel
Louie Franco, Ron Jennings, Greg Porter, Chris Arms, Greg Poree - guitars
André Cymone - guitars, keyboards
Kae Williams Jr., Kurt Shore, Fred Zarr, Andy Marvel, Eumir Deodato - keyboards
Tony Romeo, Boyd Jarvis - bass
Bobby Corea - drums
Brian Kilgore, Bashiri Johnson, Dave Darlington, Paul Simpson - percussion
Jimmy Zee: Saxophone
Tenita Jordan, Carrie Johnson, Cheryl Gatson, Diane Richards, Zoe Walken, Butch Robinson, Cuca Eschevaria - backing vocals

Production
Tracks 1 & 6 Produced by Kae Williams Jr. and Kurt Shore.  Recorded & Mixed by Mitch Goldfarb, with assistance on track 6 by Brooke Hendricks, Jim Campbell & Ryan Dorn.
Tracks 2 & 7 Produced by Kae Williams Jr., with additional production and remix on track 2 by Shep Pettibone.  Track 2 Recorded & Mixed by Joe Nicolo, Joe Alexander & Ryan Dorn; recording assisted by Jim Campbell & Robert Kloss.  Track 7 Recorded & Mixed by Joe Alexander, Ryan Dorn & Mitch Goldfarb; recording assistance by Brooke Hendricks & Jim Campbell.
Tracks 3, 8 & 10 Produced by André Cymone.  All Tracks Recorded & Mixed by Bobby Brooks; recording assistance by Brian Conley, Brian Schueble, Steve Shelton (all tracks) & Liz Cluse (track 8).
Tracks 4 & 9 Produced by Fred Zarr.  Recorded by Don Feinberg, with assistance by Bernard Bulloch, Bill Esses & Richard Joseph.  Track 4 Mixed by Michael Hutchinson.  Track 9 Mixed by Don Feinberg.
Track 5 Produced by Eumir Deodato, with remix & additional production by Paul Simpson.  Recorded & Mixed by Jon Goldberger; recording assistance by Angel Ugarte.
All Songs Published by Genetic Music, except "Heaven" (published by SBK Blackwood Music/Elastic Music/Mario Music/Genetic Music).

Charts

Notes 

1988 debut albums
Virgin Records albums
Pretty Poison albums
Albums produced by Shep Pettibone
Albums produced by André Cymone
Albums produced by Eumir Deodato